Tuña is one of 44 parishes (administrative divisions) in Tineo, a municipality within the province and autonomous community of Asturias, in northern Spain.

Notable people
 Rafael del Riego (1784–1823), Spanish general and liberal politician, who played a key role in the outbreak of the Liberal Triennium, which briefly established a constitutional monarchy

Parishes in Tineo